The Cayman Islands Digicel Cup is a cup of the Cayman Islands football, first held in 2006. It is sponsored by Digicel.

Winners
2005/06 : Money Express 2-0 George Town SC
2006/07 : Scholars International bt Tigers FC
2007/08 : Roma United 1-0 George Town SC
2008/09 : Elite SC 4-1 Scholars International
2009/10 : George Town SC 2-1 Bodden Town
2010/11 : George Town SC 3-1 Roma United
2011/12 : Elite SC 2-0 Bodden Town
2012/13 : Scholars International 0-0 (aet, 7-6 pen) Elite SC

President's Cup
2013/14 : Bodden Town FC 2-1 George Town SC
2014/15 : Bodden Town FC 1-1 Roma United SC [aet, 3-1 pen]
2015/16 : Roma United SC 2-1 Bodden Town FC [aet]
2016/17 : Scholars International 4-1 Bodden Town FC

Performance By Club

External links
 rsssf.com
 caymanactive.com

References 

Football competitions in the Cayman Islands
2006 establishments in the Cayman Islands
Recurring sporting events established in 2006